"Warning" is a song by the American rock band Green Day. It is the second single and title track from their sixth album of the same name.

Billie Joe Armstrong has said that the original concept was to create a song whose lyrics were made up of all signs and labels, and the idea grew from there.

The song was played for the first time during Bridge School Benefit played acoustic in 1999.

The song was a number three modern rock hit in the US. The song also made it into the Top 40 of the UK Singles Chart in the UK. It has been noted that the song's main guitar riff bears strong resemblance to The Kinks song "Picture Book".

This is the first Green Day song to feature a tremolo effect on the guitar; an effect used prominently in the 2004 single "Boulevard of Broken Dreams".

Despite being included in the band's greatest hits albums International Superhits! and God's Favorite Band as well as appearing as a playable track in their game Green Day: Rock Band, the band had not performed the song live for 21 years since 2001, until it was performed during a warm-up show before their performance in the 2022 Lollapalooza.

Music video
"Warning" has two music videos. The first and main music video premiered on MTV in January 2001. It was directed by Francis Lawrence and shows the life of a rather oblivious young man who does dangerous, socially unacceptable and trivial things during his day examples being rubbing soap in his eyes, swallowing toothpaste, running into across moving traffic and crossing police tape. His punch-in card reveals his name to be John Earle. The second music video features the recording and touring of the song and album edited together.

Track listing

CD 1
"Warning" (album version)
"Scumbag"
"I Don't Want to Know If You Are Lonely" (originally performed by Hüsker Dü)

CD 2
"Warning" (album version)
"Outsider" (originally performed by the Ramones)
"Suffocate"

Limited edition card sleeve version
"Warning" (album version)
"Scumbag"

Warning/Minority AU single
"Warning"
"Minority"
"Scumbag"
"Outsider" (originally performed by the Ramones)

7" Adeline
Side A
"Warning"

Side B
"Scumbag"
"Outsider" (originally performed by the Ramones)

7" Reprise
Side A
"Warning"

Side B
"Suffocate"

Charts

References

2000 singles
Green Day songs
Songs written by Billie Joe Armstrong
Music videos directed by Francis Lawrence
2000 songs
Reprise Records singles
Folk punk songs

it:Warning#Musica